The Suzuki LT250R was a sport ATV manufactured between 1985 and 1992. It combined a lightweight frame and good handling, with a 249cc liquid cooled two stroke engine. 

Commonly known as the Quadracer, it revolutionized the (ATV industry). Before this model was released, the ATV world was dominated by three-wheelers. Although the four-stroke LT250E Quadrunner was released a year earlier, it was not well accepted by racing enthusiasts that were hesitant to adopt the heavier four-wheelers over their three-wheelers. Then came the LT250R.

Most of the advances made by Suzuki with this quad have been overshadowed by the Honda TRX250R, which was released in 1986. During these early years though, they were treated as equals, with the Honda being preferred by most because of its apparent handling characteristics. Even though both model names ended with "250R", the Honda walked away with the nickname.

The LT250R setup is what is commonly used in today's sport quads, such as:
2-wheel rear drive with a solid axle
"A-Arm" front suspension
Powerful lightweight engine
Manual transmission and clutch
Hydraulic disc brakes, two in front, one for the rear
Chain drive

1985
In an apparent attention to weight by engineers, it came with many aluminum parts: swing arm, rear axle carrier, engine cases, front spindles, rear shock link. But the overall advantage in weight (compared to most other quads) is the simplicity of design. The '85 and '86 Quadracers are known as the lightest production full size race quads ever built, tipping the scales at only 293 lbs dry making them similar to the 250cc two stroke race three wheelers of that era. (They were actually lighter than the Yamaha Tri-Z, slightly heavier than the Kawasaki Tecate 3, and identical in weight to the Honda ATC250R.)

In 85 the Suzuki LT250R QuadRacer became the first high-performance four-wheeler

1986

Mostly the same as 1985 but with a Mikuni VM34SS carburetor. It also had a very slight modification to the decals, and had white letters on the seat spelling "Suzuki" instead of yellow letters used in '85.

1987

"The beaner year", many different changes occurred within this production year, sometimes making parts hard to match up.

The major changes were in the frame, engine, swingarm, and a-arms. The most visible change is in the frame right in front of the cylinder the 85-86 frame has a single down bar, but the '87+ has a single wishbone down-tube. The 85-86 exhaust goes out the side of the cylinder and the '87+ goes straight out the front in between the split downbar, hence the head pipe design changed for '87+. For '87+, a head motor mount was added and connects the engine to the backbone of the frame (under tank). The 85-86 is also a non powervalved motor as the '87+ have powervalves (Suzuki Automatic Exhaust Control). The counterbalancer, bearing and seal were changed in 1988 from the 1987 design. The front shocks are also about 3" longer than previous models.  The air intake from the carburetor to the cylinder is in a 5 bolt pattern and larger than the other years providing more air flow and was the same as the 1987 lt500r reed cage. Hence, the 87's are desired by tuners and racers for the larger base air flow. The 1988-on LT250R and the LT250R's big brother, the LT500R or Quadzilla, used the 6-bolt intake design. Also the '87+ used a 6 speed transmission instead of the 5 speed used on the 85-86 models. The engine color was changed from silver used on the 85-86 models to blue for the '87+ models.

For the '87+ model, the swingarm design was changed to a more "beefy" design after cracking / breaking issues with the 85-86 swingarm design. Clearly, the Suzuki engineers underestimated how hard their customers could ride their product. However, the '87+ swingarm will mount to the 85-86 frame with some other minor equipment swap (i.e. rear shock, link). The '87+ rear axle carrier includes forward-reverse slide chain tensioning rather than the 85-86's rotary tensioning method.  The '87+ carrier housing slides forward and reverse and then is held in place by four vertical bolts and two rear horizontal bolts whereas the 85-86 carrier was held with a clamp or pinch design.

The '87 and '88 rear axles continued to have 24 splines axles that were the same as the 85-86 models.  In '89, this was changed to a 26 spline axle similar to the LT500R. The hubs on the 1987 models went to a 5/130 bolt pattern similar to the LT500R). This was in contrast to the 4/130 bolt pattern of 85-86. The front fenders are the same and will swap between any year. The rear fenders will swap between any year, but the '91 and '92 model years were different under the seat in order to access the air filter which was relocated due to the redesign of the rear suspension. The '91 and '92 rear plastic actually has a curved metal bar riveted under the seat to help support the plastic due to the larger void in the plastic moulding necessary to access the air filter. (Note that the original rear plastic for '85 - '90 is no longer available from Suzuki. All new rear plastic is the '91-92 style with the riveted bar under the seat.)

The seats changed drastically in '87. They flare out at the rear (like a "T") while the 85-86 has a straight seat. There are also some cosmetic differences between the seats of various years. '85 had yellow hollow letters spelling "Suzuki" on the sides. In '86, they changed these letters to white. On the "T" seat in '89, they added the words "QuadRacer" to the back in white letters. In '91 and '92, they added splashes of teal all throughout the blue seat in a "camo" type of pattern.

1988–1990
 LT250R J,K,L

|-
| Engine Type
| Liquid-cooled, single cylinder, 2-stroke
|-
| Displacement
| 246cc
|-
| Bore and stroke
| 67.0mm X 70.0mm

Compression Ratio
8.0 to 1

|-
| Carburetion
| Mikuni TM 34SS
|-
| Transmission
| Manual Clutch, 6-speed
|-
| Starter
| Primary Kick
|-
| Fuel Tank Capacity
| 3.0 gallons
|-
| Wheelbase
| 50.4 inches
|-
| Overall length
| 72 inches
|-
| Ground Clearance
| 4.9 inches
|-
| Front Suspension
| 8.7" travel, dual shocks, preload and rebound adjustable
|-
| Rear Suspension
| 8.7" travel, Suzuki Full Floater single shock, preload, compression, and rebound adjustable
|-
| Front Brakes
| Dual hydraulic discs
|-
| Rear Brakes
| Single hydraulic disc
|-
| Front Tires
| Dunlop 21x7x10
|-
| Rear Tires
| Dunlop 21x10x10
|-
| Final Drive
| Chain
|-
| Dry Weight (1987-1990)
| 324 lbs
|-
| MSRP
| $3498
|}

88-92 changed from 5-bolt(87) 8-petal reed valve 6-bolt 6-petal reed valve.

1991–1992
  LT250R M,N

The 1991 model year brought about a different linkage in the rear suspension, similar to the LT500R. This necessitated the differences to the rear plastic under the seat as mentioned above.

They also came with rear heel guards that required a few minor changes to the frame, footpegs, and swingarm pivot bolt.

Suzuki ATVs